Gottfried Curio (born 2 September 1960) is a German politician for the Alternative for Germany (AfD) and since 2017 member of the Bundestag.

Life and achievements 

Curio was born 1960 in Westberlin and studied physics and mathematics at the Free University of Berlin.
Curio entered the AfD in 2014 and became after the 2016 Berlin state election member of the 'Abgeordnetenhaus' (house of delegates), the federal state diet of Berlin.

In 2017 Curio was elected to the Bundestag, the German federal parliament.

References

Members of the Bundestag for Berlin
Free University of Berlin alumni
Politicians from Berlin
1960 births
Living people
Members of the Bundestag 2017–2021
Members of the Bundestag 2021–2025
Members of the Bundestag for the Alternative for Germany